Karacaali can refer to:

 Karacaali, Biga
 Karacaali, Keşan